Whitney Gardner is an author and illustrator from Victoria, British Columbia. Her young adult novel  You're Welcome Universe, which has an Indian, Deaf protagonist, was the winner of the 2018 Schneider Family Book Award. Her novel Chaotic Good was nominated for a 2019 White Pine Award. Gardner is represented by Charlie Olsen of Inkwell Management. Her first graphic novel Fake Blood received a starred review from Kirkus Reviews and was called "a dazzling debut".

Personal life

Gardner grew up in New York. She has a BFA from SUNY Purchase in graphic design and worked as an art teacher and school librarian in the Bronx before moving to Portland, Oregon and then settling in Canada. She is married and she and her husband have two pugs named Gouda and Fig. She plays ukulele.

Bibliography
 You're Welcome, Universe (2017)
 Chaotic Good (2018)
 Becoming RBG (Illustrations by) (2019)
 Long Distance (2021)

References

External links
 Personal site

Living people
American women cartoonists
American graphic novelists
American female comics artists
Female comics writers
Year of birth missing (living people)
American cartoonists
21st-century American women